The Za-Bum Circus is a 1944 Italian comedy film directed by Mario Mattoli and starring Galeazzo Benti.

Cast
 Galeazzo Benti (segment "Galop finale al circo")
 Carlo Campanini(segment "Gelosia")
 Vera Carmi (segment "Galop finale al circo")
 Ada Dondini (segment "Galop finale al circo")
 Aldo Fabrizi as The postman (segments "Dalla finestra" and "Il postino")
 Roldano Lupi (segments "Contatto telefonici", "Gelosia" and "Galop finale al circo")
 Ave Ninchi (segment "Galop finale al circo")
 Carlo Ninchi (segments "Contatto telefonici" and "Galop finale al circo")

References

External links

1944 films
1944 comedy films
Italian comedy films
1940s Italian-language films
Italian black-and-white films
Films directed by Mario Mattoli
1940s Italian films